The 2011–12 season was Associazione Sportiva Roma's 84th in existence and 79th season in the top flight of Italian football. Before the season started Roma changed their manager. The now former manager Vincenzo Montella, did not get his contract extended and was therefore released. Later he was hired to be the new head coach for Catania.
Instead, Roma selected former Real Madrid and Barcelona player Luis Enrique to be their new head coach. After a sixth-place finish in 2010–11, Roma were hoping to improve their position and to capture their fourth Scudetto. Roma was eliminated in the play-off round of Europa League after losing 2–1 on aggregate against Slovan Bratislava. Roma also competed in the Coppa Italia, being knocked out in the quarter-finals.

Players

Squad information
Last updated on 13 May 2012
Appearances include league matches only

Transfers

In

Total spending:  €83.3M

Loans in

Total spending:  €4.75M

Out

Total income:  €25.8M

Net Income:  €47.7M

Loans out

Total income:  €0M

Net Income:  €4.75M

Pre-season and friendlies

Competitions

Overall

Last updated: 13 May 2012

Serie A

League table

Results summary

Results by round

Matches

Coppa Italia

UEFA Europa League

Having qualified for the Europa League play-off round in the previous Serie A campaign, Roma played a double-legged match for their chance to enter the Europa League. On August 5, 2011, Roma drew Slovakian side ŠK Slovan Bratislava. Roma was eliminated from Europa League after losing 2–1 on aggregate.

Play-off round

Statistics

Appearances and goals

|-
! colspan=14 style="background:#B21B1C; color:#FFD700; text-align:center"| Goalkeepers

|-
! colspan=14 style="background:#B21B1C; color:#FFD700; text-align:center"| Defenders

|-
! colspan=14 style="background:#B21B1C; color:#FFD700; text-align:center"| Midfielders

|-
! colspan=14 style="background:#B21B1C; color:#FFD700; text-align:center"| Forwards

|-
! colspan=14 style="background:#B21B1C; color:#FFD700; text-align:center"| Players transferred out during the season

Goalscorers

Last updated: 13 May 2012

Clean sheets

Last updated: 13 May 2012

Disciplinary record

Last updated:

References

A.S. Roma seasons
Roma
Roma